Dolores de la Colina Flores (born 26 December 1948, Tampico, Tamaulipas, Mexico) is a popular singer and songwriter from the 1970s based in Mexico. She has written songs for Manoella Torres, Lupita D'Alessio, Sophy, José José, José Luis Rodríguez "El Puma", Daniela Romo, Arianna, Stephanie Salas, Raphael, Moncho, Manolo Muñoz, Vikki Carr, Trigo Limpio, Ana Gabriel, Raquel Olmedo, María Dolores Pradera, Olga Guillott, Gloria Lasso, Bebo y Cigala, Emmanuel, Estela Núñez, María Jiménez, Pedro Fernández, Verónica Castro, Manuel Mijares, Lucero, Yuri, Kika Edgar, Roberto Blades, Pepe Aguilar, Chavela Vargas, La Lupe, Marco Antonio Muñiz, Ernesto D'alessio and many other singers in different music styles. In 1974, she was discovered while in Puerto Rico by Tico/Alegre's Joe Cain and signed to the label.

Lolita de la Colina has received numerous awards throughout her successful career, as the national 1st place and international 3rd place at the Festival OTI 1978. It also highlights that she has received on television and the Heraldos of Mexico, as well as multiple awards from the ACRIM and Acca as its renowned author and composer.
Lolita de la Colina has conquered a place of honor in the world of Spanish-speaking dedicated songwriters.

In 2014, she was inducted into the Latin Songwriters Hall of Fame.

References

External links 

Mexican women singer-songwriters
Mexican singer-songwriters
Living people
1948 births
Latin music songwriters
Women in Latin music